Vierlas is a municipality located in Zaragoza Province, Aragon, Spain. According to the 2004 census (INE), the municipality has a population of 98 inhabitants.

Location 
Vierlas is located in the province of Zaragoza on the road between Tarazona and Tudela, known as El Tarazonica.

References

Municipalities in the Province of Zaragoza